The Ansonia Apartments, located at 2221-23 Jones Street in the Midtown area of Omaha, Nebraska. Built in 1929 in a period Revival/Arts and Crafts style, the buildings were designated an Omaha Landmark on March 27, 1984. It was added to the Drake Court Historic District, and was added to the National Register of Historic Places on June 4, 2014.

The Ansonia Apartment building was built in a U-shape that with end walls facing the street. Adjacent to the neighboring Dartmore Apartments, the Ansonia Apartment building displays both Arts and Crafts and Period Revival elements.

See also
 Landmarks in Omaha, Nebraska

References

Apartment buildings in Omaha, Nebraska
Omaha Landmarks
National Register of Historic Places in Omaha, Nebraska
Residential buildings completed in 1929
Residential buildings on the National Register of Historic Places in Nebraska